The Jungle Bunch to the Rescue (also known as  in French) is a French CGI animated television series. It was created by Jean-François Tosti, Eric Tosti and produced by Toulouse-based , Seaworld Kids, and Master Films. 
The series is about Maurice, a penguin that thinks he is a tiger, and his misfit friends. Together, they are the defenders of the jungle. The series' 1st season premiered on December 29, 2013 in France and the second season aired on November 2, 2015. 
The Jungle Bunch to the rescue won an International Emmy Award in Category Kids: Animation in 2014 and is aired in more than 180 territories. In the UK it previously aired on Boomerang, and in the US it airs on Universal Kids.

Synopsis
The show focuses on a bunch of animals embodying justice and hope, who are always ready for adventure and funny situations.

Characters

 Maurice, a brave emperor penguin who thinks that he is a tiger
 Junior, a Tiger barb who is Maurice's adopted son
 Miguel, a dimwitted blue gorilla
 Batricia, a female fruitbat
 Gilbert a neurotic brown tarsier
 Al, a thin orange glass frog
 Bob, an overweight green cane toad
 Fred, a singing warthog

Episodes

Film

The series has been adapted from a 52-minute animated film titled The Jungle Bunch: The Movie (originally ; The Jungle Bunch: Back to the Ice Floe). The film aired on France 3, on December 31, 2011 and was released on April 10, 2013. This film was included as premium at the Kidscreen Awards.

In 2017 a feature film simply titled The Jungle Bunch was released.

Awards and nominations
 San Diego International Kids Film Festival 2015 : Grand Jury Prize - Best Short for the TV special The Great Treasure Quest
 New York Festivals 2015 : Final Certificate
 International Emmy Awards 2014
 Cartoons on the Bay 2014 : Pucinella Award for Best Children TV series
 Kidscreen Awards 2013 : TV Movie Award for The Jungle Bunch: Back to the Ice Floe

References

 Official website The Jungle Bunch To The Rescue! Season 2
 Distributor website The Jungle Bunch

External links
 

2013 French television series debuts
2020 French television series endings
2010s French animated television series
French computer-animated television series
French children's animated action television series
French children's animated adventure television series
French children's animated comedy television series
French-language television shows
English-language television shows
Animated television series about penguins
Animated television series about apes
Animated television series about frogs
Jungles in fiction
Television shows set on islands